Anatolii Gennadievich Golyshev (born 14 February 1995) is a Russian professional ice hockey forward for Avtomobilist Yekaterinburg of the Kontinental Hockey League (KHL). He was selected by the New York Islanders in the fourth round, 95th overall, of the 2016 NHL Entry Draft.

Playing career
Golyshev played as a youth within hometown club, Molot Perm, before joining Avtomobilist Yekaterinburg as a junior in the 2012–13 season. Golyshev made his professional debut in the Kontinental Hockey League with Yekaterinburg during the following 2013-14 season.

Having been the longest tenured player in completing his eighth season with Avtomobilist Yekaterinburg in the 2020–21 season, placing fifth in team scoring with 27 points through 53 games, Golyshev left the club following a first-round exit to Avangard Omsk.

With the New York Islanders still in possession of his NHL rights, Golyshev was signed to a one-year, two-way contract to immediately join the division leading club in the midst of the pandemic delayed 2020–21 season on 20 March 2021. He remained on the roster throughout the Islander playoffs push to the semi-finals, without featuring in a game.

As a restricted free agent, Golyshev agreed to terms on a one-year, $750,000 contract with the Islanders on 23 September 2021. After attending the Islanders 2021 training camp, Golyshev having left a positive impression, was assigned to begin the  season with American Hockey League affiliate, the Bridgeport Islanders. Golyshev posted 5 goals through 15 games with Bridgeport before he was recalled to the Islanders through the club's crisis with COVID-19 amongst the roster. Returned to the AHL without featuring with New York, Golyshev seeing limited opportunity opted to be placed on unconditional waivers in order to mutually terminate his contract with the Islanders on 8 December 2021. On 14 December, Golyshev signed a contract until the end of the 2021–22 season with Avtomobilist Yekaterinburg.

Career statistics

Regular season and playoffs

International

Awards and honors

References

External links 

1995 births
Living people
Avtomobilist Yekaterinburg players
Bridgeport Islanders players
New York Islanders draft picks
Russian ice hockey right wingers
Sputnik Nizhny Tagil players
Sportspeople from Perm, Russia